Dușmani is a village in Glodeni District, Moldova.

Notable people
 Petru Picior-Mare

References

Villages of Glodeni District